Pazhani is a 2008 Indian Tamil-language action drama film written and directed by Perarasu. It stars Bharath, Kajal Aggarwal  and Khushbu Sundar. It was Bharath's first film as an action hero with a new mass image and also marked Kajal’s Tamil debut. The film, produced by director Sakthi Chidambaram under the banner Cinema Paradise, had musical score by Srikanth Deva. The film was formally launched on 10 August 2007 and was released on 14 January 2008 which coincided with the Thai Pongal festival. It received mostly mixed to positive reviews and become a super hit at the box office. It was later dubbed into Telugu as Bhargava and into Hindi as Shaktishali Shiva. It was also remade into Oriya as Gud Boy (2012).

Plot
Pazhanivel is released from jail after 15 years and accidentally saves Jeevanandham from some goons, following which he gets appointed as Jeevanandham's car driver. Karpagambal is Jeevanandham's wife and also Pazhani's sister, which he learns later. Pazhani hides his identity from Karpagambal and reveals his name as Vellaiyan, as she has a hatred towards her brother from childhood. Meanwhile, Pazhani falls in love with Deepti. Pazhani suddenly finds out that Jeevanandham has a concubine named Durga, who is always money-minded.

Karpagambal finds out that Pazhani is her brother and gets furious. She also sends him out of his job. Now, Karpagambal finds out the real truth about her brother. A flashback is shown where Karpagambal and Pazhanivel's father, Meiyappan, had a concubine and Pazhani killed her at the age of ten. He is then arrested and jailed for the well-being of his mother. As Karapagambal was unaware of the reason behind the murder, she developed a hatred towards Pazhani right from childhood. Knowing the truth, Karpagambal understands Pazhani and she tells him not to come to her husband's house and see her again.

However, Jeevanandham has other plans now. He decides to divorce Karpagambal and marry Durga legally. Pazhani challenges Jeevanandham and tries all means to save Karpagambal. Jeevanandham stages a foul play along with Vaikundan, an unscrupulous moneylender. Everyone believes that Vaikundan confiscated Jeevanandham's house, following which Karpagambal is sent out of the house, but Pazhani arrives and takes Karpagambal along with him. Vaikundan cheats Jeevanandham and takes away his home for real, which shocks Jeevanandham.

Pazhani plays tricks and makes Karpagambal as the owner of the export firm owned by Jeevanandham, as the business is registered in the name of Karpagambal. Jeevanandham is left penniless, and to his surprise, Durga ditches him and joins hands with Vaikundan. Jeevanandham realizes his mistakes. Finally, Pazhani kills both Vaikundan and Durga in a fight. Pazhani is arrested for the murders and goes to jail. Pazhani feels happy that at first he landed up in jail for the well-being of his mother, and now he is jailed for the well-being of his sister.

Cast

Bharath as Pazhanivel "Pazhani" (Vellaiyan)
Kajal Aggarwal as Deepti, Pazhani's love interest
Khushbu Sundar as Karpagambal, Pazhanivel's sister
Biju Menon as Jeevanandham, Karpagambal's husband
Aishwarya as Durga, Jeevanandham's concubine
Raj Kapoor as Vaikundan
Yaar Kannan as Meiyappan, Pazhanivel's father
Rekha as Poovathal Pazhanivel's mother
Ravi Mariya as Ekadasi
Balu Anand as Jail Warden
Anu Mohan as Jagadish
M. S. Bhaskar
Alex
Chitti Babu as Pazhani's jail friend
 Bava Lakshmanan as Watchman
Bobby as Inspector Kanniappan
C. R. Saraswathi as Deepti's mother
Priyanka as Deepti's sister
Velmurugan as Groom
Kovai Babu as Groom
Swamidev
M. J. Shriram
Suja Varunee as an item number in the song, "Lokku Lokku"
Perarasu as Thiruthani (director)

Production
It was announced in 2007 that Bharath would collaborate with Perarasu. The song sequence, "Thiruvaroor Therae", was shot at Prasad Studios with various chariots. More than fifty junior artists in colourful costumes and more than thousand other artists participated in the song.

Soundtrack
The soundtrack was composed by Srikanth Deva and released on 8 November 2007. All lyrics were written by the film's director Perarasu.

Release
The film was released in Pongal 2008 alongside other Tamil releases like Bheemaa, Pirivom Santhippom, Kaalai, Vaazhthugal and Pidichirukku. The film faced problems before release as the producer failed to pay the debt.

Reception
The movie received mixed reviews. Behindwoods.com gave 2.5/5 saying "Pazhani is not for an audience looking for something offbeat and inventive but for an audience craving for some old formulaic entertainment – loads of action thrown in with mother- sister sentiment" The movie has too many Silent Mass scenes, which kept the audience at the edge of their seats. The film was an average at the box office.

References

External links
 

Films directed by Perarasu
Indian action films
2008 action films
2008 films
Tamil films remade in other languages
2000s Tamil-language films
Films scored by Srikanth Deva